
Gmina Dobre is a rural gmina (administrative district) in Mińsk County, Masovian Voivodeship, in east-central Poland.

Villages
Gmina Dobre contains the villages and settlements of Adamów, Antonina, Brzozowica, Czarnocin, Czarnogłów, Dobre, Drop, Duchów, Gęsianka, Głęboczyca, Grabniak, Jaczewek, Joanin, Kąty-Borucza, Kobylanka, Makówiec Duży, Makówiec Mały, Marcelin, Mlęcin, Modecin, Nowa Wieś, Osęczyzna, Pokrzywnik, Poręby Nowe, Poręby Stare, Rąbierz-Kolonia, Radoszyna, Rakówiec, Ruda-Pniewnik, Rudno, Rudzienko, Rynia, Sąchocin, Sołki, Świdrów, Walentów, Wólka Czarnogłowska, Wólka Kobylańska, Wólka Kokosia and Wólka Mlęcka.

Neighbouring gminas
Gmina Dobre is bordered by the gminas of Jakubów, Kałuszyn, Korytnica, Stanisławów, Strachówka and Wierzbno.

References

Polish official population figures 2006

Dobre
Gmina Dobre